Expand Networks, Ltd. was a Tel Aviv, Israel based provider of WAN optimization technology founded in 1998 and liquidated in 2011.

About 
Expand Networks was a privately held company, co-founded by Talmon Marco in 1998; initial financing  was provided by Discount Investment Corporation Ltd., The Eurocom Group, Ophir Holdings, and a private group of investors, including Memco Software founder Israel Mezin. Additional investors joined in subsequent rounds of funding. The company raised over $95 million.

Expand Networks headquarters was in Tel-Aviv, Israel with sales in the United States and Europe, New Jersey, Australia,  China, Singapore, and South Africa.

The company manufactured accelerators in physical, virtual and mobile deployment options.

Liquidation 
In mid October 2011, following the requests of Plenus, one of the company's lenders, an Israeli court appointed a liquidator - Paz Rimer. The liquidator gradually terminated the company's employees  and eventually, on 11 January 2012 sold most of the assets of the company to Riverbed Technology, which immediately terminated all the company's products and ceased support.

External links
 Expand Networks Home Page
  Expand Networks reassures partners it's business as usual

References

Software companies established in 1998
Software companies of Israel
WAN optimization
Companies based in Essex County, New Jersey
Networking hardware companies
Israeli companies established in 1998
1998 establishments in New Jersey
2011 disestablishments in Israel
Software companies disestablished in 2011